The 2023 German Masters (officially the 2023 BetVictor German Masters) was a professional snooker tournament that took place from 1 to 5 February 2023 at the Tempodrom in Berlin, Germany. Organised by the World Snooker Tour and sponsored by sports betting company BetVictor, the tournament was the tenth ranking event of the 2022–23 snooker season and the seventh of the eight events in the European Series. The 17th edition of the German Masters, first held in 1995 as the German Open, the tournament was broadcast by Eurosport in Europe and by multiple other broadcasters internationally. The winner received £80,000 from a total prize fund of £427,000.

The reigning world champion and world number one Ronnie O'Sullivan withdrew from the tournament and was replaced by Ross Muir. Many other highly ranked players—including Mark Allen, Stuart Bingham, Ryan Day, Ding Junhui, Barry Hawkins, John Higgins, Shaun Murphy, Mark Selby, Judd Trump, and Mark Williams—lost in the qualifying rounds, which were held from 21 to 26 November 2022 at the Morningside Arena in Leicester, England. In December 2022 and January 2023, amid a match-fixing investigation, the sport's governing body suspended four players who had qualified: Li Hang, Zhao Jianbo, and the previous year's finalists Yan Bingtao and Zhao Xintong. Their opponents received walkovers to the next round. Only four players ranked inside the world's top 16—Luca Brecel, Jack Lisowski, Neil Robertson, and Kyren Wilson—featured at the main stage in Berlin.

Zhao Xintong won the 2022 event, defeating Yan 9–0 in the final, but was unable to defend the title due to his suspension. Jimmy White defeated Peng Yisong 5–1 in the last 32, becoming the first player over 60 to reach the last 16 of a ranking event since Eddie Charlton at the 1992 British Open. Ali Carter defeated Tom Ford 10–3 in the final to win the tournament for a second time, following his previous win in 2013. It was Carter's fifth ranking title and his first ranking win since the 2016 World Open. He moved up eight places to 15th in the world rankings after the event.

Robert Milkins made the third maximum break of his career, the highest of the tournament, in his quarter-final match against Chris Wakelin. Milkins also made a 146 break in his last-32 match against Daniel Wells.

Prize fund 
The event featured a total prize fund of £427,000 with the winner receiving £80,000.

 Winner: £80,000
 Runner-up: £35,000
 Semi-final: £17,500
 Quarter-final: £11,000
 Last 16: £7,500
 Last 32: £4,500
 Last 64: £3,000
 Highest break: £5,000
 Total: £427,000

Main draw
Below are the event's results from the last-32 stage to the final. Player names in bold denote match winners. Numbers in brackets denote player seedings.

{{#invoke:RoundN|main|columns=5
|bold_winner    = high
|short_brackets = yes
|team-width     = 220
|3rdplace       = no
|RD1 = Last 32Best of 9 frames
|RD2 = Last 16Best of 9 frames
|RD3 = Quarter-finalsBest of 9 frames
|RD4 = Semi-finalsBest of 11 frames
|RD5 = FinalBest of 19 frames

|| (1)|w/d|{{flagathlete|Tom Ford|ENG}} (32)|w/o
|||5 | (17)|1
||{{flagathlete|Jimmy Robertson|ENG}} (24)|w/o ||w/d
|||2 | (8)|5
|||1 ||5
|| (12)|5 ||0
|||5 ||4
|||5 ||2
|| (3)|5 | (30)|3
|||5 ||4
|||2 | (11)|5
|| (27)|5 ||3
|||5 ||4
|||w/d |{{flagathlete|Ali Carter|ENG}} (23)|w/o
||

Final

Qualifying
Qualifying for the event took place between 21 and 26 November 2022 at the Morningside Arena in Leicester, England. There were three rounds of qualifying, where the first round consisted of two pre-qualifier matches only. All qualifier matches were played as best-of-nine frames.

Round 1 (Pre-Qualifiers) 
PQ1:  5–0 
PQ2:  5–0

Rounds 2 and 3

Century breaks

Main stage centuries

Total: 27

 147, 146, 109  Robert Milkins
 133, 130, 122, 121, 120, 111  Ali Carter
 133, 118  Neil Robertson
 128  Matthew Stevens
 125  Daniel Wells
 121, 104  Tom Ford
 120, 115  Elliot Slessor
 117, 102  Jack Lisowski
 117  Si Jiahui
 116, 102  Chris Wakelin
 114  Louis Heathcote
 114  Tian Pengfei
 112  Kyren Wilson
 107  Pang Junxu
 100  Xiao Guodong

Qualifying stage centuries 

Total: 60

 144  Fergal O'Brien
 143, 119  Ding Junhui
 139, 101  Ali Carter
 139  Fan Zhengyi
 137, 123  Lyu Haotian
 133, 108  Anthony McGill
 133  Zhang Anda
 133  Liam Highfield
 132  Michael White
 131  Xu Si
 129, 102  Yan Bingtao
 129, 101  David Grace
 129  Sam Craigie
 127  Judd Trump
 124, 102  Alexander Ursenbacher
 121, 110  Gary Wilson
 119, 110, 109  Kyren Wilson
 119  Jack Lisowski
 117, 100  Graeme Dott
 117  Jamie Jones
 116  Ricky Walden
 115  Mark Allen
 115  Xiao Guodong
 110  John Higgins
 110  Jackson Page
 108, 105  Elliot Slessor
 108, 102  Zhao Xintong
 107, 105  Joe O'Connor
 106, 100  Tian Pengfei
 104  Neil Robertson
 103, 101  Louis Heathcote
 103  Barry Pinches
 102, 100  Jimmy Robertson
 102  Jamie Clarke
 102  David Gilbert
 102  David Lilley
 102  Joe Perry
 101  Ryan Day
 101  Scott Donaldson
 101  Rod Lawler
 101  Matthew Selt
 100  James Cahill
 100  Duane Jones

References

2023
German Masters
Masters
Sports competitions in Berlin
February 2023 sports events in Germany
European Series